SBI Mutual Fund is a payment system introduced by State Bank of India (SBI) and incorporated in 1987 with its corporate head office located in Mumbai, India. SBIFMPL is a joint venture between the State Bank of India, an Indian public sector bank, and Amundi, a European asset management company. A shareholder agreement in this regard has been entered on April 13, 2011, between SBI & AMUNDI Asset Management. Accordingly, SBI currently holds 63% stake in SBIFMPL and the 37% stake is held by AMUNDI Asset Management through a wholly owned subsidiary, Amundi India Holding. SBI & AMUNDI Asset Management shall jointly develop the company as an asset management company of international repute by adopting global best practices and maintaining international standards.

History
The mutual fund industry in India originally began in 1963 with the Unit Trust of India (UTI) as a Government of India and the Reserve Bank of India initiative. Launched in 1987, SBI Mutual Fund became the first non-UTI mutual fund in India. In July 2004, State Bank of India decided to divest 37 per cent of its holding in its mutual fund arm, SBI Funds Management Pvt Ltd, to Societe Generale Asset Management, for an amount in excess of $35 million.

Post-divestment, State Bank of India's stake in the mutual fund arm came down to 67%. In May 2011, Amundi picked up 37% stake in SBI Funds Management, that was held by Societe Generale Asset Management, as part of a global move to merge its asset management business with Crédit Agricole.

SBI Funds Management Private Limited (SBIFMPL) has been appointed as the Asset Management Company of the SBI Mutual Fund. SBIFMPL is a joint venture between the State Bank of India, an Indian public sector bank, and Amundi, a European asset management company.

As of September, 2019, the fund house claims to serve 5,809,315 unique investors through approximately 212 branches PAN India.
As of September 2021, the total AUM stands at Rs.579318.29 crores.

Key milestones

1987 – Establishment of SBI Mutual Fund 
1991 – Launch of SBI Magnum Equity Fund 
1999 – Launch of sector funds, India's first contra fund: SBI Contra Fund
2001 – Involvement in Ketan Parekh Scam SBI Mutual Fund, according to the CBI charge-sheet, purchased 22 lakh shares at Rs 165 each in February 2000 through off-market deals from Ketan Parekh-controlled firms.[22]
2004 – Joint Venture with Societe General Asset Management
2006 – Became the first bank-sponsored fund to launch an offshore fund – SBI Resurgent India Opportunities Fund
2011 – Stake Transfer from SGAM to Amundi Asset Management
2013 – Acquisition of Daiwa Mutual Fund, part of the Tokyo-based Daiwa Securities Group
2013 – Launch of SBI Fund Guru, an investor education initiative 
2015 – Employees' Provident Fund Organisation decided to invest in the equity market for the first time by investing  Rs. 5,000 crore in the Nifty and Sensex ETFs (Exchange Traded Fund) of SBI Mutual Fund 
2018 – First AMC in India to launch an Environment, Social and Governance (ESG) fund viz Magnum Equity ESG Fund
2018 – Signatory to the United Nations Principles for Responsible Investment (UN-PRI)

Products and Services

Equity 
The company offers a wide array of equity funds ranging from diversified to thematic and sector-based offerings.

Debt
The company has a robust product range matching all maturities for cash management. The focus of investment philosophy is primarily on the product's liquidity as well as on the quality of the securities held in the portfolio.

Hybrid
Hybrid Schemes invest in a mixture of multiple asset classes like debt, equity, and gold in different proportions based on the investment objective. The company has a suite of products across the risk-spectrum including a multi-asset offering that has gold in the portfolio into the traditional mix of equity and debt.

Other Large Mutual Fund Houses 
Some of the major competitors for SBI Mutual Fund in the mutual fund sector are Axis Mutual Fund, Birla Sun Life Mutual Fund, HDFC Mutual Fund, ICICI Prudential Mutual Fund, Kotak Mutual Fund, Nippon India Mutual Fund and UTI Mutual Fund .

See also
 Mutual funds in India
State Bank of India

References

External links
 

Financial services companies based in Mumbai
Mutual funds of India
Financial services companies established in 1987
1987 establishments in Maharashtra
Indian companies established in 1987